The 2019 FIA Formula One World Championship was the motor racing championship for Formula One cars which marked the 70th running of the Formula One World Championship. It is recognised by the governing body of international motorsport, the Fédération Internationale de l'Automobile (FIA), as the highest class of competition for open-wheel racing cars. Starting in March and ending in December, the championship was contested over twenty-one Grands Prix. Drivers competed for the title of World Drivers' Champion, and teams for the title of World Constructors' Champion.

Entries
Ten teams, with two drivers each, competed in the championship in 2019. All teams competed with tyres supplied by Pirelli.

Free practice drivers 
Across the season, two drivers drove as a test or third driver in free practice sessions.

Team changes
Red Bull Racing ended its twelve-year partnership with Renault and switched to Honda engines. Neither team is recognised as Honda's official factory team under the terms of the agreement.

Racing Point F1 Team completed their transition from the Racing Point Force India identity that they used after a consortium led by Lawrence Stroll purchased the assets of Sahara Force India in August 2018.

The Sauber name disappeared entirely from the Formula One grid, but is still used in the Formula 2 and Formula 3 support categories for Charouz Racing System.

Haas F1 Team signed a title sponsorship agreement with energy drinks manufacturer Rich Energy for 2019 before the end of the 2018 season. However, this agreement was later terminated on 9 September 2019, due to a series of off-track disputes between Haas and Rich Energy, and legal issues for Rich Energy.

Driver changes

The lead up to the 2019 championship saw several driver changes. Daniil Kvyat rejoined Toro Rosso after last racing for the team in 2017. He was partnered with Formula 2 driver Alexander Albon, who replaced Brendon Hartley. Albon subsequently became only the second Thai driver to race in Formula One after Prince Bira.

Sainz was partnered with 2017 European Formula 3 champion and Formula 2 runner-up Lando Norris, who replaced Stoffel Vandoorne, who would move to Formula E to race with the Mercedes-affiliated HWA Racelab, as well as join Mercedes as a reserve driver.

Charles Leclerc left Alfa Romeo Racing after one year with the team, replacing 2007 World Champion Kimi Räikkönen at Ferrari. He was partnered with Antonio Giovinazzi, who made two starts for Sauber when he replaced the injured Pascal Wehrlein in 2017. Marcus Ericsson moved to race in the IndyCar Series in 2019 with Schmidt Peterson Motorsports but remained with Alfa Romeo as a third driver and brand ambassador.

Lance Stroll would join the Racing Point UK F1 team, replacing Esteban Ocon, who joined Mercedes as a reserve driver. Ocon shared the role of simulator driver with Stoffel Vandoorne. Reigning Formula 2 champion and Mercedes junior George Russell joined Williams replacing Stroll. Sergey Sirotkin would depart Williams due to his backer deciding to stop sponsoring Williams due to the lack of performance and development of the car. Sirotkin returned to Renault as a reserve driver. He would be replaced by Robert Kubica; Kubica's return comes after an eight-year absence brought on by a near-fatal rally car crash in 2011 that left him with serious arm injuries.

Mid-season changes
In the build-up to the Belgian Grand Prix, Red Bull Racing announced that Pierre Gasly would be demoted to Toro Rosso and Alexander Albon would be promoted in his place so that his performance would be evaluated in view of the team's 2020 line-up. The decision to release Gasly was criticised as he had completed just twelve races with the team, while Albon and Toro Rosso team-mate Daniil Kvyat had both previously been released from contracts with the Red Bull Junior Team and Red Bull Racing respectively.

Calendar

The following twenty-one Grands Prix were run as part of the 2019 World Championship.

Calendar changes
The Mexican and United States Grands Prix swapped places on the calendar so that the United States round follows the Mexican Grand Prix.

Regulation change
Race Director and Technical Delegate Charlie Whiting died days before the opening race of the season in Australia. Deputy Race Director Michael Masi was named as his successor for Race Director.

Technical regulations
In a bid to improve overtaking, teams agreed to a series of aerodynamic changes that affect the profile of the front and rear wings. The front wing endplates were reshaped to alter the airflow across the car and reduce the effects of aerodynamic turbulence and winglets above the main plane of the front wing have been banned. The slot in the rear wing was widened, making the drag reduction system (DRS) more powerful. The agreed-upon changes were drawn from the findings of a working group set up to investigate potential changes to the technical regulations in preparation for the  championship. The front wing was made  wider,  higher, and moved  further forward. The rear wing was made  wider and  higher, with a  larger DRS opening.

Parts of the technical regulations governing bodywork were rewritten in a bid to promote sponsorship opportunities for teams. The agreed changes are to mandate smaller bargeboards and limit aerodynamic development of the rear wing endplates to create more space for sponsor logos. The changes were introduced as a response to falling revenues amid teams and the struggles of smaller teams to secure new sponsors.

Driver weights are no longer considered when measuring the minimum weight of the car. This change was agreed to following concerns that drivers were being forced to lose dangerous amounts of weight in order to offset the additional weight of the post- turbo-hybrid engines. The changes were introduced to eliminate the advantage drivers with a naturally smaller body shape had over taller and heavier drivers and to discourage unhealthy diet and exercise regimes to improve performance.

Sporting regulations
The regulations introduced a bonus point to the driver (and the constructor) that sets the fastest lap in a race. The point is only awarded if the driver is classified in the top ten at the end of the race. This makes 2019 the first time since 1959 that a bonus point gets awarded for setting the fastest lap.

Driver safety
The FIA introduced a new standard for driver helmets with the intention of improving safety. Under the new standard, helmets will be subjected to a more thorough range of crash tests aimed at improving energy absorption and deflection as well as reducing the likelihood of objects penetrating the helmet's structure. All certified helmet manufacturers were required to pass the tests in advance of the 2019 championship to have their certification renewed. Once introduced to Formula One, the new standard will gradually be applied to all helmets used by competitors in every FIA-sanctioned event.

Tyres

Tyre supplier Pirelli renamed its range of tyres following a request from the FIA and the sport's management. Under the new plan, names given to particular compounds, such as "hypersoft" and "ultrasoft", were replaced by referring during each race to the three compounds teams have available for that race as soft, medium and hard. This was intended to aid fans in understanding the tyre compounds used at each round. The actual compounds for the season were referred to by number, from the firmest ("1") to the softest ("5"). Seven compounds were available in 2018, although only six of the seven were used, the "superhard" not being used at all. Pirelli continued to decide which three compounds are made available for each race. The practice of using colours to identify the specific compound (such as pink for the hypersoft) was discontinued, with white, yellow and red being used for the three compounds available for each race where white denoted the hardest available compound and red the softest. As all five compounds were available in testing there were slight variations in the details on the tyre sidewalls to distinguish between the different compounds during testing.

Season report

Opening rounds
The season started with the Australian Grand Prix, won by Valtteri Bottas from second on the grid in dominant fashion, finishing 20 seconds ahead of Mercedes teammate Lewis Hamilton who himself only narrowly beat Red Bull's Max Verstappen to second. Verstappen's third place marked the first podium for a Honda powered car in over 10 years, last achieved at the 2008 British Grand Prix.

The second race of the season was the Bahrain Grand Prix. Ferrari topped every practice session and then went on to lock out the front row in qualifying. Charles Leclerc earned the first pole position of his career by setting a lap time 3 tenths of a second quicker than his teammate Sebastian Vettel. In the race, Leclerc fell down to 3rd in the 1st corner behind Vettel and the championship leader Valtteri Bottas. However, he then climbed back up the order to take the lead despite being told by his team, Ferrari, not to overtake his teammate. Late in the race, Leclerc was leading by around 10 seconds before his engine developed an issue, allowing Lewis Hamilton to take the race lead. A few laps later, Valtteri Bottas also overtook Leclerc pushing him down to 3rd and making it a Mercedes 1–2. Just as it was looking like Max Verstappen was going to overtake Leclerc as well, a safety car was called out due to both of the Renault cars of Nico Hülkenberg and Daniel Ricciardo having engine and power issues at turns 1 and 3. The race finished behind the safety car for the eighth time in F1 history. As a result, Lewis Hamilton won, Valtteri Bottas came second, and Charles Leclerc came home third for his first podium and Ferrari's first podium of the season. After the race Valtteri Bottas led the Drivers' Championship by 1 point over teammate Lewis Hamilton.

At round three, the Chinese Grand Prix which was noted as F1's 1000th race, Hamilton led away at the start and won the Grand Prix, resulting in him taking the championship lead by 6 points over his teammate Bottas, whilst Mercedes extended their lead over Ferrari, becoming the first team since Williams in 1992 to start a season with 3 consecutive 1–2
finishes. Pierre Gasly set the fastest lap and finished in sixth, after pitting with 3 laps remaining as Ferrari got their second podium of the season with Vettel.

At the next round, the Azerbaijan Grand Prix, it was a different story. In the first practice session, George Russell's Williams made contact with a drain cover down the straight on the floor after Charles Leclerc, who was fastest in the session because it was suspended, also made contact with the drain cover but with his left front tyre. The next two practice sessions were all about Leclerc, being fastest in all three practice sessions. In qualifying, Pierre Gasly was fastest in the first session but did not set a time in the second because it was irrelevant since he would start in the pitlane for not stopping for the weighbridge in one practice session. Charles Leclerc, the favourite for pole, timed 2nd in the first session and was 5th in the second session, but crashed at turn 8 in the same session, locking up his tyres and missing the apex, going into the barrier. This meant that Leclerc's qualifying was over, at least physically; he did make it into the final session but did not set a time as a result of the crash. Valtteri Bottas took pole ahead of championship leader Hamilton. Kimi Räikkönen originally qualified ninth, but started from the pitlane after his car failed a front wing deflection test and joined Red Bull driver Gasly in starting in the pitlane as his teammate, Antonio Giovinazzi, received a ten-place grid penalty for using a third control electronic in his power unit and started 17th. In the race, Lewis Hamilton did get the better start, but Bottas had better pace and stayed in the lead. Charles Leclerc, who started 8th, was 4th after losing two spots in the opening lap and was getting steady pace with leader Bottas on the fresh set of medium tyres he got as a result of his crash during qualifying. After Bottas, Hamilton, and Sebastian Vettel pitted for tyres, Charles Leclerc took the lead and led the race for a long time. Eventually, Bottas retook the lead from Leclerc who had not pitted yet at that time. A virtual safety car was deployed after an incident with Daniel Ricciardo and Daniil Kvyat at a runoff area. Bottas won the race by 1.5 seconds over teammate Hamilton and took a 1-point lead in the Drivers' Championship. Charles Leclerc took his 2nd fastest lap after pitting with less than 5 laps remaining as his teammate, Sebastian Vettel, took 3rd place for the team.

Middle of the season
At the Spanish Grand Prix, Valtteri Bottas dominated the entire qualifying session, finishing in first place each time, thus giving him his third consecutive pole of the 2019 season. Hamilton, however, got past him quickly at the first corner in the race. The safety car was deployed on lap 44 after a collision between Racing Point's Lance Stroll and McLaren's Lando Norris, which ultimately did not change the positions of the top 6 runners. Mercedes finished again for their fifth 1–2 finish as Hamilton took the chequered flag (along with the fastest lap point) and Bottas four seconds behind. Red Bull's Max Verstappen completed the podium.

At the Monaco Grand Prix, teams and drivers honoured the memory of F1 legend and Mercedes non-executive chairman Niki Lauda, who had died the week before the race. Mercedes painted their halos red and other teams and some drivers memorialised Lauda on their cars and helmets. Mercedes locked out the front row of the grid again, with Hamilton on pole and Bottas in second. During the race, Red Bull's Max Verstappen was released unsafely from his pit box and impeded Valtteri Bottas, resulting in a five-second time penalty for Verstappen. In the second half of the race, Hamilton was on the radio complaining about his graining tyres, but his team kept him out. Second-placed Verstappen kept the pressure on Hamilton, with Verstappen coming close to Hamilton in the final laps of the race at the Nouvelle Chicane. Hamilton went on to win the race and although Verstappen was second, his penalty was applied and it demoted him to fourth place. This promoted Ferrari's Sebastian Vettel to second and Mercedes's Bottas to third, ending Mercedes's 1–2 winning streak.

At the Canadian Grand Prix, free practice was eventful. Championship leader Lewis Hamilton made contact with the wall at turn 8, damaging his car, and some other drivers made contact not just there, but also at the Wall of Champions. Qualifying 2 was red-flagged after Kevin Magnussen slammed into the Wall of Champions, which also affected some racers trying to improve their times. At the end of qualifying, Ferrari's Sebastian Vettel won pole position ahead of Hamilton. Vettel led from the start until lap 48, when he lost control of his Ferrari and slid across the grass at turn 3, regaining control as he came back onto the circuit and nearly colliding with Hamilton. The stewards controversially gave Vettel a five-second time penalty for this incident as they deemed it an unsafe re-entry to the track and impeding Hamilton. Although Vettel crossed the finish line first, Hamilton was less than five seconds behind, so was promoted to first place after the penalty was applied. Vettel's teammate, Charles Leclerc finished in third place, and Mercedes's Valtteri Bottas received the fastest lap bonus point. Although Ferrari had intended to appeal the ruling, they withdrew but reviewed the evidence further. During free practice at the next race, the stewards announced that they would not review Ferrari's new evidence, thus the final standings stood with Hamilton in first and Vettel in second.

At the French Grand Prix, Mercedes dominated the free practice sessions. Hamilton was summoned to the stewards' office for rejoining the track unsafely, forcing Red Bull's Max Verstappen off the track, but no penalty was issued. Mercedes locked out the front row again in qualifying with Hamilton on pole and Bottas in second. Mercedes secured their sixth 1–2 of the season with Hamilton finishing 18 seconds ahead of Bottas, and Leclerc completing the podium less than a second behind Bottas. At the end of the final lap, fifth-placed finisher Vettel set the fastest lap for a bonus point.

At the Austrian Grand Prix, some drivers spun off the track in free practice due to wind. In qualifying, Leclerc secured his second pole position. Verstappen was promoted to second and Bottas third after second-placed Hamilton was given a grid penalty for impeding Kimi Räikkönen in Q1. In the race, Leclerc led away as Verstappen lost a few positions at the start. However, Verstappen found power for his car and managed to come back, passing Leclerc with just a few laps left. An investigation followed after contact was made between the two at turn 3 on lap 69, but the stewards deemed it a racing incident. All drivers finished the race, with Verstappen winning the race for a second consecutive year as well as setting the fastest lap. Leclerc finished second and Bottas finished third. It was the first win for a Honda-powered F1 car since Jenson Button in the 2006 Hungarian Grand Prix, and the first non-Mercedes win in 2019.

At the British Grand Prix, the newly resurfaced track surface caused plenty of eventful moments throughout the weekend, with Romain Grosjean crashing his car on the pit exit and Kimi Räikkönen's Alfa Romeo stopping on the Wellington straight, the latter of which brought out a red flag. The drivers all struggled with track grip levels throughout the session, and although there was some brief rain, it had little impact on the running in the session. Championship leader Lewis Hamilton was chasing for a 6th consecutive pole position at Silverstone but Bottas pipped him to pole by 0.006 seconds, almost as close as the 0.002-second time gap by which Vettel beat Fernando Alonso in the 2010 German Grand Prix. The opening laps did provide for some battling between the two Mercedes drivers, but the safety car played a crucial role in the Mercedes battle when Giovinazzi became stuck in the gravel trap at the penultimate corner and Hamilton pitted under the safety car, whereas Bottas had already pitted a few laps earlier during open racing. Thereafter, Vettel and Verstappen were battling for 3rd when Vettel misjudged his braking point at Vale corner and rammed into the back of Verstappen, resulting in a 10-second penalty, which led Vettel to finish behind the two Williamses. It also promoted Pierre Gasly to a joint career-best finish of 4th. Leclerc took 3rd, Bottas took 2nd, and Lewis Hamilton won his 6th British Grand Prix, equalling the record for the most home grand prix wins with Alain Prost. Hamilton also set the fastest lap on the final lap with the hardest tyre, which he ran for most of the race.

At the German Grand Prix, Mercedes ran a special one-off livery to commemorate their 125th anniversary in motorsport. Ferrari looked set to be the favourites for pole, having been fastest in every practice session, but both hit technical difficulties during qualifying, leaving Hamilton to take pole. Vettel started the race from last place. Everything changed in the race as it rained heavily before the start, leading the race to have a standing start for the first time. As the race progressed, many drivers spun off or crashed, particularly at the final two turns of the track, where Nico Hülkenberg and Charles Leclerc ended their races. Hülkenberg was on course to take his first ever podium before he crashed out. Hamilton also fell victim at the same place, but managed to keep going with a broken front wing. He was later penalized for entering the pit lane outside the bollard, later having a spin, and ended up 11th. Max Verstappen went on to claim victory in the race, with Vettel recovering from last to second, and the third podium place went to Toro Rosso's Daniil Kvyat, who made a stop for slick tyres late in the race to claim his third career podium and Toro Rosso's first since the 2008 Italian Grand Prix, after a close battle with Racing Point's Lance Stroll. Post-race, both Alfa Romeos, which finished 7th and 8th, were penalized for technical infringements, promoting Hamilton and Williams's Robert Kubica into the points, the latter scoring Williams's first – and what turned out to be only – points of the season, as well as his first since the 2010 Abu Dhabi Grand Prix.

Verstappen took his maiden pole at the Hungarian Grand Prix, equalling the record with Sir Jackie Stewart for taking the most victories before a maiden pole. An unexpected extra stop for Hamilton soon led him to winning the race and beating Verstappen in the closing laps, who was suffering from graining tyres late in the race, having been battling with Hamilton previously.

The two tracks immediately after the summer break were more suited to Ferrari's top speed advantage, with Leclerc winning both the Belgian and Italian Grands Prix from pole position. In both races, Leclerc was under strong pressure from Hamilton throughout, winning the Belgian race by less than a second, before Hamilton ultimately dropped back after missing the first chicane in Italy. This enabled Bottas to finish second and slightly close up in the title race. Leclerc won his first two career wins consecutively and within the timespan of one week, as Vettel and Verstappen endured two terrible weekends. His victory at Belgium was an emotional one, as the race was overshadowed by the death of Formula 2 driver Anthoine Hubert the previous day. The Renault junior driver was involved in an accident on lap 2 of the Feature Race, succumbing to his injuries later that evening. This saw Leclerc close up in the battle for third in the Drivers' Championship. Leclerc also became the first Ferrari Monza winner since Fernando Alonso's victory in 2010. Qualifying sessions for both races were unusual in that Leclerc won pole by a sizeable margin of more than 0.7 seconds on a dry track in Belgium, whereas almost the entire Q3 field missed crossing the line in time for their second timed lap at Monza, as no driver wanted to be at the front of the group as they would not have the advantage of a tow from the car in front – a significant benefit at Monza, the season's fastest track.

Closing rounds
Vettel ended a winless streak stretching over a year to win at the Singapore Grand Prix for Ferrari, the team's third consecutive victory. Leclerc had qualified on pole ahead of Hamilton and Vettel and led the first stint. However, a timely pitstop by Vettel saw him unintentionally undercutting Leclerc with an outlap three seconds faster than Leclerc's inlap. Hamilton then tried an overcut that did not work, limiting him to a fourth-place finish, as Mercedes were off the podium with both cars. Hamilton initially kept a reasonable pace, before his tyres fell off and the midfield cars behind him started to run faster laptimes than him. After his pitstop, he was unable to pass Verstappen, who finished third. There were three safety car spells in the second half of the race, although the complexion of the Singapore circuit made the restarts uneventful up front as the top cars ran in formation. This marked the first time in eleven years that Ferrari had won three races in a row and was Vettel's record fifth win at Singapore, and also the first time a team has finished 1–2 in Singapore. The race results saw Leclerc move ahead of Verstappen and climb to third in the standings for the first time of the season.

Leclerc took his fourth consecutive pole at the Russian Grand Prix, but at the start of the race, it was Vettel who led, contradicting a pre-race agreement that had been discussed. Vettel led until he made his first stop on lap 26, but an engine component failed just after his stop, prompting his retirement (the four-time World Champion even demanding the return of V12 engines as in the 1990s on the team radio as he ground to a halt). This prompted a Virtual Safety Car, during which both Mercedes as well as Leclerc pitted, therefore resulting in a 1–2 finish for Mercedes with Hamilton winning. Leclerc could only finish third behind the Mercedeses.

Because of Typhoon Hagibis, all events for Saturday, with the exception of qualifying, were cancelled with qualifying instead being rescheduled to Sunday morning. Vettel and Leclerc both locked out the front row for a Ferrari 1–2, with Bottas and Mercedes not far behind. The Red Bull drivers of Verstappen and Albon finished with the exact same Q3 time, but Verstappen received the position ahead of his teammate as he was released first. At the race, Vettel had an issue when the lights went out to start the race, letting Bottas pass by easily. Leclerc and Verstappen had a tangle at turn 2 on the opening lap, which saw Leclerc being given a five-second penalty; he was later given a ten-second penalty for driving in an unsafe condition after the collision. Verstappen eventually retired from the race, his second DNF of the season. The chequered flag was waved a lap early, and though Sergio Pérez of Racing Point crashed out, his 9th place standing was left intact as the results of the race were taken from lap 52. Bottas of Mercedes finished first, Vettel of Ferrari finished second, and Hamilton finished third with Hamilton receiving the fastest lap point. With the 1–3 finish for Mercedes, the team had secured their sixth consecutive Constructors' Championship. Renault had both drivers disqualified for a technical infringement following a protest from Racing Point.

At the Mexican Grand Prix, Hamilton won his tenth Grand Prix of the season, after a first-corner touch with Verstappen that saw them both crossing the grass at turn 2. Verstappen lost several positions, and in fighting his way back past Bottas sustained a puncture that effectively ended his challenge. Sebastian Vettel finished second and Valtteri Bottas third. Although Hamilton could have taken the World Championship, he was unable to outscore Bottas by a sufficient number of points.

Second place in the race was enough for Hamilton to claim his sixth World Drivers' Championship making him the second most successful Formula One driver in terms of Championship wins behind Michael Schumacher.

At the Brazilian Grand Prix, Verstappen won from pole. Pierre Gasly and Carlos Sainz Jr. took their first podiums, finishing 2nd and 3rd respectively. The race changed dramatically on lap 53 when Valtteri Bottas retired with an engine problem, bringing out the safety car to bunch up the field. Immediately after the end of the safety-car period, Ferrari teammates Charles Leclerc and Sebastian Vettel collided on the back straight, causing both to retire. Debris from the incident brought out the safety car again, returning to the pits with two laps remaining. Following the restart, Lewis Hamilton misjudged an overtaking manoeuvre on Alexander Albon, putting the latter into a spin and dropping him from a podium position to being out of the points. Hamilton's car was damaged but he was able to continue, although he lost second place to Pierre Gasly. Gasly and Hamilton were involved in a dramatic flat-out race to the finish line, with DRS being unavailable as this was only the second lap following the safety car ending. Gasly held onto second place, with his ability to keep Hamilton's Mercedes at bay in a straight fight being a major show of strength for the Honda engine. Hamilton occupied the final step of the podium, but was later given a 5-second time penalty for causing the incident with Albon. This dropped him to 7th and promoted Carlos Sainz Jr. to his first podium in Formula One in his 101st race – the longest any podium winner has had to wait for his first podium in F1 history.

Hamilton took pole position at the Abu Dhabi Grand Prix, ending his pole-less streak since Germany, and went on to dominate and win the race, taking the sixth Grand Slam of his career. Verstappen was initially overtaken by Leclerc at the start but despite having minor engine issues, managed to repass him later on. Leclerc had been summoned to the stewards regarding a fuel issue, and Ferrari were fined €50,000 while Leclerc got to keep his position. Bottas, who started from 20th and last due to multiple engine penalties, was able to recover to 4th place, despite a DRS issue affecting the entire grid for the first 17 laps of the race.

Results and standings

Grands Prix

Scoring system

Points were awarded to the top ten classified drivers and the driver who set the fastest lap. The points were awarded for every race, using the following system:

The point for fastest lap was only awarded if the driver was classified in the top ten for the race. Two fastest lap points were not awarded this season as Kevin Magnussen and Valtteri Bottas set the fastest lap but did not classify within the top ten in Singapore and Brazil, respectively. As Daniil Kvyat and Nico Hülkenberg ended the season with an identical number of points, a count-back system was used as a tie-breaker, with the driver's best result used to decide the standings.

World Drivers' Championship standings

Notes:
 – Driver did not finish the Grand Prix, but was classified as he completed more than 90% of the race distance.

World Constructors' Championship standings
{|
|style="vertical-align:top; text-align:center"|

|style="vertical-align:top"|

|}
Notes:
 – Driver did not finish the Grand Prix, but was classified as he completed more than 90% of the race distance.
 The standings are sorted by best result, rows are not related to the drivers. In case of tie on points, the best positions achieved determined the outcome.

Notes

References

External links

 

 
Formula One seasons
Formula 1